is a district located in Nagasaki Prefecture, Japan.

As of January 1, 2009 the district has an estimated population of 22,893 and a density of 107 persons per km2. The total area is 213.97 km2. It forms part of the Gotō Islands.

Towns and villages
Shinkamigotō

Mergers
On August 1, 2004 the city of Fukue and the towns of Kishiku, Miiraku, Naru, Tamanoura and Tomie merged to form the city of Gotō.
On August 1, 2004 the towns of Arikawa, Kamigotō, Narao, Shin'uonome and Wakamatsu merged to form the new town of Shinkamigotō.

Districts in Nagasaki Prefecture